VKA may refer to:

 Vitamin K antagonist
 VKA Vodka
 Vanavasi Kalyan Ashram
 Veon, Kopp and Associates